Colborn is a surname, and may refer to:

Jim Colborn (born 1946), American baseball player
Nigel Colborn, British Television presenter and gardening expert/writer
Dr. Theo Colborn (born 1927), Founder and President of The Endocrine Disruption Exchange
Joe "Bohannon" Colborn, one half of Chicago radio personality duo Eddie & JoBo

See also 

 Colborne Lodge, museum in Ontario, Canada
 Colborne Meredith, Canadian architect
 Colborne Parish, New Brunswick

Surnames
English-language surnames
Surnames of English origin
Surnames of British Isles origin